The 1823 Delaware gubernatorial special election was held on October 7, 1823. A few months into his three-year term, Democratic-Republican Governor Joseph Haslet died in office, elevating State Senate Speaker Charles Thomas to the governorship and triggering a special election in 1823. Justice of the Peace David Hazzard ran as the Democratic-Republican nominee to succeed Thomas and faced State Senator Samuel Paynter, the Federalist nominee. Paynter narrowly defeated Hazzard, regaining the office for the Federalists.

General election

Results

References

Bibliography
 
 
 

1823
Delaware
Gubernatorial
Delaware 1823